Tilwara, historically known as Khedgarh is a village in Pachpadra tehsil of Barmer district of Rajasthan state in India. Tilwara is situated on the Luni River and is a railway station on Jodhpur-Balotra route. The village is famous for Mallinath Fair held in March/April every year. Also called Tilwara cattle fair it lasts for two weeks. Tilwara is also an archeological site from where evidence for the Mesolithic culture have been excavated.

References

Tourist attractions in Barmer district
Villages in Barmer district